Anastasia M. Ashman (born August 8, 1964) is an American author, a digital strategist, and co-founder of global personal branding startup GlobalNiche.net.

Background
Ashman was born in 1964 in Berkeley, California.  She graduated from Berkeley High School (1982), and received her Bachelor of Arts from Bryn Mawr College in Classical Greek, Roman, and Near Eastern Archaeology (1986). An expat for 14 years, she has resided in Rome, Italy; Kuala Lumpur, Malaysia; and Istanbul, Turkey. She and her Turkish husband, Burc Sahinoglu live in San Francisco, California.

Ashman spent a decade in New York and Los Angeles media and entertainment circles, working in operations and administration for literary agents and producers of film, television, and Broadway theatre, and as an online editor and business editor specializing in digital publishing for an Internet industry and ebusiness magazine and trade show arm of a B2B mass media corporation in Silicon Alley.

Career
Ashman is a cultural essayist, editor and cultural producer. Her arts, travel and culture journalism and criticism has appeared in a wide range of publications, from international business newspapers and newsmagazines, like the Hong Kong-based Dow Jones properties The Wall Street Journal Asia and Far Eastern Economic Review, to The Village Voice and National Geographic Traveler. She has written about Nyonya food, reviewed Tropical Classical, an essay collection by Pico Iyer and covered a posthumous anthology by Brion Gysin. For Cornucopia, she has written about the cultural contortions of joining a Turkish family.

Along with American writer Jennifer Eaton Gökmen, she is the co-editor of the nonfiction anthology Tales from the Expat Harem: Foreign Women in Modern Turkey (Emeryville: Seal Press, 2006).  The anthology, by 29 expatriate women from five nations, spans the length and breadth of Turkey as well as the last four decades as scholars, artists, missionaries, journalists, entrepreneurs and Peace Corps volunteers assimilate into Turkish friendship, neighborhood, wifehood, and motherhood. The expatriate literature collection has risen to national top ten bestselling spots in the US and the UK, and is also published in Turkey, (Istanbul: Doğan Kitap, 2005) where it was a #1 national bestseller in January 2006, and has been translated into Turkish as Türkçe Sevmek (Istanbul: Doğan Kitap, 2005), with a foreword on womanhood, national identity and non-belonging by the controversial and award-winning Turkish novelist Elif Shafak.

Ashman's personal essays appear in the humor travel collection The Thong Also Rises: Further Misadventures From Funny Women on the Road (Palo Alto: Travelers' Tales, 2005) and in The Subway Chronicles: Scenes From Life in New York (New York: Plume-Penguin, 2006).

The author, along with co-editor Jennifer Eaton Gokmen, was interviewed on NBC's Today, on its occasional travel segment Where in the World Is Matt Lauer? in May 2008.

Along with Janera Soerel, the founder of Global Nomad Salons and an online magazine and members-only social network, which explore issues of global citizenship and hybrid-identities, Ashman has co-produced the Near East's 1st Global Nomad Salon in Istanbul, part of a worldwide series of intellectual dinner parties where diners discuss issues of global culture and economics. In 2009, she became a founding member of TED Global, the international conference of ideas in Oxford, England.

She is also a blogger, a top ten microblogger on the Twitter platform in Turkey and deemed by Forbes.com as among the "top twenty women for entrepreneurs to follow". She is creator of a neoculture community for global citizens and identity adventurers. Among her web ventures which highlight the city of Istanbul and the adventures of identity are: the expat+HAREM Istanbul 2010 web carnival, curating the best views from around the web and around the world in celebration of the Turkish city as European Capital of Culture in 2010; and Dialogue2010, a podcast and Twitterchat series of dynamic, real-time conversations on art, culture, and hybrid identity.

She combines her cultural and global sensibilities with her publishing, Internet and media background in her online identity management and digital content marketing work.

Works
 Tales from the Expat Harem: Foreign Women in Modern Turkey
 Ashman's Cultural Producer Blog Furthering the Worldwide Cultural Conversation
 Doğan Kitap, Turkish publisher of Tales from the Expat Harem and Turkish version, Türkçe Sevmek
 Seal Press, North American publisher of Tales from the Expat Harem
 The Thong Also Rises: Further Misadventures from Funny Women on the Road
 The Subway Chronicles: Scenes from Life in New York

Awards and honors
From the international relations group Daughters of Atatürk, Ashman and her Expat Harem co-editor were honored with the 2006 "Woman of Distinction Award", an annual title bestowed on women who have "demonstrated vision, leadership, innovation and professionalism" in "giving their talents to the international Turkish community". Other 2006 honorees include Güler Sabancı, Caroline Finkel, and Leslie Peirce.
"Top twenty women for entrepreneurs to follow on Twitter"

References

1964 births
American women bloggers
American bloggers
American book editors
American expatriates in Turkey
American feminist writers
American humorists
American travel writers
Berkeley High School (Berkeley, California) alumni
Bryn Mawr College alumni
Living people
Writers from Berkeley, California
American women travel writers
American women essayists
Women humorists
Women print editors
21st-century American essayists
21st-century American women writers